Franklin Sound is a narrow waterway between the two largest islands, Flinders Island and Cape Barren Island in the Furneaux Group, at the southeastern end of Bass Strait, between Victoria and Tasmania, Australia.

Named after British explorer and Lieutenant-Governor of Van Diemen's Land (1836-1843), Sir John Franklin (1786-1847).

Numerous sandbanks and small islands obstruct the sound and the tidal stream runs at 2 to 3 knots.

References